Theodore T. Robinson (born August 14, 1904) was an American college football player and coach. He served as the head football coach at Morehouse College in 1926.

References

1904 births
Year of death missing
Morehouse Maroon Tigers football coaches
Oberlin Yeomen football players